Elytrurini is a weevil tribe in the subfamily Entiminae.

Genera 
Amphionotus – Anomalodermus – Desmelytrurus – Elytrurus – Epizorus – Gaynaria

References 

 Marshall, G.A.K. 1956: Notes on the Campyloscelinae (Coleoptera Curculionidae). Revue de zoologie et de botanique africaines, 54(3-4): 224-240

External links 

Entiminae
Polyphaga tribes